Harrington's Breweries is a microbrewery based in Christchurch, New Zealand.

History
Harrington's Breweries was founded by John and Val Harrington in 1991.  The first beer was brewed on 15 July 1991 at the Old Wards Brewery site on Kilmore Street, Christchurch. Their first set up allowed them to make 3500 litres a week. Demand soon exceeded supply and in 1993 they moved to their much larger and their current location in Ferry Road, Christchurch. The move increased their capacity to 50000 litres a week. In 2012 they were awarded "Champion Brewery" at the Brewers Guild of New Zealand Awards.

Today 
Harrington's Breweries was bought by Lion in July 2018.

References

External links
 Harrington's Breweries

Breweries of New Zealand
Companies based in Christchurch
Food and drink companies established in 1991
New Zealand companies established in 1991